BAE Systems Maritime – Naval Ships is a wholly owned subsidiary company of BAE Systems, specialising in naval surface shipbuilding and combat systems integration. One of three divisions of BAE Systems Maritime, along with BAE Systems Submarines and BAE Systems Maritime – Maritime Services, it is the largest shipbuilding company in the United Kingdom, one of the largest shipbuilders in Europe, and one of the world's largest builders of complex warships.

It was originally formed as a joint stock subsidiary on 1 July 2008, with the merger of BAE Systems Surface Fleet Solutions and VT Shipbuilding, creating a new firm named BVT Surface Fleet.

The new firm incorporated the BAE Systems Surface Fleet Solutions operated shipyards at Scotstoun and Govan on the River Clyde in Glasgow and the VT Shipbuilding facilities within the Naval Base at Portsmouth.

BAE Systems subsequently acquired VT Group's share of the joint venture on 30 October 2009 and renamed the business BAE Systems Surface Ships Ltd.

On 1 January 2011, BAE Systems Surface Ships was operationally integrated with BAE Systems Submarine Solutions to form BAE Systems Maritime. On 1 January 2012, BAE Systems Surface Ships was formally restructured and rebranded as BAE Systems Maritime – Naval Ships and BAE Systems Maritime – Maritime Services, the former incorporating the shipbuilding operations and combat systems development and the latter in-service support.

History

Defence Industrial Strategy
The Ministry of Defence's (MOD) 2005 Defence Industrial Strategy encouraged BAE and VT Group to form a naval shipbuilding joint venture with the aim of maintaining the UK's naval shipbuilding capability in the long-term. In return, in July 2007 the MoD guaranteed the new company a certain amount of work for 15 years, or to pay penalties instead. The Terms of Business Agreement (ToBA) finally signed in July 2009 promised a minimum level of ship build and support activity of around £230 million/year to sustain a warship industry in the UK. The government could cancel the deal at any time, subject to penalties which would decline over the course of the agreement but which would have been £630m at the time of the 2010 SDSR, in lieu of the MoD's existing liability for rationalisation costs under Yellow Book rules.

Explaining the rationale for the joint venture from VT Group's perspective, its CEO Paul Lester described shipbuilding as a "lumpy" business, dependent on large contracts placed at irregular intervals. Another issue was the competition between VT and BAE: "We don't want to get into a dogfight with BAE over who would be the survivor... That's what you'd be talking about at some stage."

BAE and VT concluded the merger discussions in early 2008, however creation of BVT Surface Fleet was conditional on the signing of contracts for the  aircraft carriers. Following the Ministry of Defence's announcement on 20 May 2008 that it intended to proceed with the manufacturing stage of the project, BAE announced its intention to finalise the joint venture arrangements with VT Group. This was completed on 11 June 2008 and, following VT Group shareholder approval on 30 June, the joint venture became operational on 1 July.

BAE Systems and VT Group owned 55% and 45% of the company respectively, however they had equal board representation and voting rights.

In return, VT Group acquired BAE System's 50% share in their other joint venture company Flagship Training, now known as VT Flagship. BVT Surface Fleet subsumed another BAE/VT joint venture, Fleet Support Limited, a ship repair, maintenance and marine engineering company, based within HMNB Portsmouth.

The new 15-year Terms of Business Agreement with the Ministry of Defence did result in some controversy however. On 30 June 2009, a BVT memo was leaked which suggested that two of the company's three shipyards could be closed following completion of Queen Elizabeth-class carrier construction. In response to the leak, BVT said the memo was "worst-case scenario planning" and that it continues to invest in the future of all its yards. However a MOD spokesman said "[the MOD] had to look at the consequences of reduced demand for navy shipbuilding." No firm decisions will be taken until after the Scottish independence referendum in September 2014 as London has made it clear that it would not buy warships from a foreign shipyard. The preferred plan is to consolidate shipbuilding onto the Govan site and invest £300m in a new covered "frigate factory" to build the Type 26.

Locations

BAE Systems Surface Fleet Solutions owns one shipyard on the River Clyde in Glasgow: Scotstoun (formerly Yarrow Shipbuilders Ltd) and runs the second Govan (formerly Kvaerner Govan, Govan Shipbuilders, Upper Clyde Shipbuilders and Fairfields), shipyard that have a corporate heritage extending back as far as 1834. VT Shipbuilding (formerly Vosper Thornycroft) owned shipbuilding facilities completed in 2003 within HMNB Portsmouth and a boatyard, VT Halmatic, in Portchester. These facilities were transferred to BVT Surface Fleet, although the VT Halmatic yard was subsequently sold to Trafalgar Wharf, with the Halmatic Small Boats Centre of Excellence moving to a new facility in Portsmouth Naval Base.

BAE Systems Surface Fleet Solutions also operated an additional project management centre at Filton in Bristol, situated close to key stakeholders at MoD Abbey Wood, which was transferred to BVT.

The BAE Systems Submarines Shipyard at Barrow-in-Furness was not included in the joint venture, although since January 2011 Submarines and Surface Ships were operationally integrated under BAE Systems Maritime.

VT Group exit
At the time of BVT's creation, VT Group was expected to eventually sell its minority share to BAE Systems through a put option, but not within three years. However, on 28 January 2009 VT Group announced its intention to sell its share. VT Group's put option valued its share at a minimum of £380 million subject to conditions; however it received £346 million after various payments to BAE. In addition, VT Group agreed to pay £43 million compensation to BVT for cost overruns on contracts with Trinidad & Tobago and Oman that BVT had inherited from VT Shipbuilding. VT Group's net proceeds from the sale of its share in BVT to BAE Systems were therefore £303 million.

Products and services

Aircraft carriers and amphibious assault ships
BAE Systems Maritime is undertaking a majority of the workload for the two  aircraft carriers, the first of which was floated off in July 2014 and is now in commission. The second is now undergoing sea trials. As part of the Aircraft Carrier Alliance, Thales and Babcock are also involved in the project. The company's shipyards have previously had experience of constructing large amphibious assault ships, including the Ocean-class LPH, the Albion-class LPD and the Bay-class LSD(A)s.

Destroyers
BAE's three shipyards all built sections of the Type 45 destroyer, which started as a collaboration between BAE and VT Group. The first of class entered service in May 2009.

In 2007 BAE produced a concept for a UXV Combatant based on a destroyer hull for the operation of unmanned land, air and sea systems.

Frigates and corvettes
BAE Systems Maritime inherited the £400 million Khareef-class corvette project from VT Group, which will see three  ships delivered to the Royal Navy of Oman in 2013–14.

BAE Systems Maritime – Naval Ships' yards have also delivered the following in the recent past:

 s to the Royal Brunei Navy (Indonesian Navy from 2013)
 s to the Royal Navy of Oman
  for the Royal Malaysian Navy

Design work is currently underway on the Type 26 frigate project for the Royal Navy, as part of the wider Global Combat Ship programme, which will eventually replace the Type 23 frigates currently in service. Construction of the first of class, HMS Glasgow, started on 20 July 2017 with first steel being cut in the Govan shipyard.

Offshore patrol vessels and fast attack craft
VT Shipbuilding was responsible for the construction of four s for the Royal Navy, with through-life maintenance the ongoing responsibility of BAE Systems Maritime; initially the company leased them to the UK Ministry of Defence until the MoD found the money to buy them. The company completed three  OPVs based on the Rivers for the Trinidad and Tobago Defence Force in 2010. After the contract was cancelled by the Trinidad & Tobago government in September 2010, these vessels were subsequently contracted for delivery to the Brazilian Navy in January 2012 as the Amazonas class. A technology transfer agreement with Bangkok Dock to build a similar  OPV, for the Royal Thai Navy was agreed in June 2009. In 2014 the Royal Navy company signed a £348m deal for three improved Rivers to keep the company busy until Type 26 construction began using money that would have been paid to BAE anyway under the ToBA.

Auxiliaries
BAE was initially part of a consortium bidding for the Military Afloat Reach and Sustainability (MARS) programme, which was to see up to six replenishment at sea tankers built for the Royal Fleet Auxiliary. BAE was partnered with BMT Defence Services and Daewoo Shipbuilding & Marine Engineering – the eventual winners – for the project, but subsequently withdrew from the consortium before the final round.

BAE Systems had previously been prime contractor on the  programme for the Royal Fleet Auxiliary.

Halmatic small boats

These products include the Lifespan Patrol Vessel, Rigid Raider, Mk 6 Assault Boat and Combat Support Boat types currently in service with the British Armed Forces and other Navies, such as the Jordanian Royal Naval Force and the Republic of Singapore Navy.

Support services
BAE Systems Maritime's Support services include supply chain management and logistics support. The BAE subsidiary BAE Systems Maritime – Maritime Services provides through life maintenance, ship repair and drydock refit services for naval and merchant vessels.

Past projects have included the reactivation of the Upholder class, now reactivated as the Victoria-class submarines for the Royal Canadian Navy. It has also refitted two ex-Royal Navy Type 22 (Batch 2) frigates for the Romanian Naval Forces and a similar programme for the Chilean Navy involving the refurbishment of three ex-Royal Navy Type 23 frigates.

In July 2009, BVT Surface Fleet established the Gulf Logistics and Naval Support joint venture with Abu Dhabi Shipbuilding, to provide in-region maritime support services for CCASG member states.

See also
BAE Systems
BAE Systems Marine (1999–2003)
BAE Systems Naval Ships (2003–2006)
BAE Systems Surface Fleet Solutions (2006–2008)
BAE Systems Maritime – Maritime Services (2012–present)
BAE Systems Submarines (2012–present)
VT Group
BAE Systems Ship Repair (United States)
BAE Systems Southeast Shipyards
BAE Systems Australia (Naval)

References

External links
BAE Systems Maritime – Naval Ships' website

BAE Systems subsidiaries and divisions
Defence companies of the United Kingdom
Shipbuilding companies of England
2008 establishments in England
Companies based in Portsmouth
Manufacturing companies based in Glasgow
River Clyde
British Shipbuilders